Kerstin Johannesson (born 1955) is a Swedish biologist.

From the age of fifteen, Johannesson resided on the island of Tjärnö in Strömstad Municipality during the summer, where the University of Gothenburg's Tjärnö Marine Biological Laboratory was located. Living on Tjärnö inspired Johannesson's interest in marine sciences, and she later attended the University of Gothenburg to study biology. She subsequently joined the University of Gothenburg's faculty, and became an elected member of the Royal Swedish Academy of Sciences.

References

People from Strömstad Municipality
20th-century biologists
Women ecologists
Swedish ecologists
Swedish marine biologists
Women marine biologists
Members of the Royal Swedish Academy of Sciences
21st-century Swedish women scientists
21st-century biologists
University of Gothenburg alumni
Academic staff of the University of Gothenburg
Swedish women biologists
1955 births
Living people